In the Bosom of the Enemy is a 2001 Filipino war drama film directed by Gil Portes. The film stars Mylene Dizon and Jomari Yllana.

Plot
After her husband was arrested from being a Guerilla warrior, Pilar agreed to be a wet nurse to the Japanese General's infant son whose Filipina wife died from giving birth. While attending and taking care of the baby, an unintentional love affair developed between Pilar and the General Hiroshi. She begins to be isolated from her husband and her townspeople as she refused to help the Guerillas to conspire the General's administration following the battle between the Guerillas and the Japanese Soldiers.

Cast
 Mylene Dizon as Pilar
 Jomari Yllana as Diego
 Kenji Motoki as General Hiroshi (Japanese: 陸軍大将浩史, Rikugun-Taishō Hiroshi)
 Mario Magallona as Kojima (Japanese: 児島, Kojima)
 Randy Wong as Uchida (Japanese: 内田, Uchida)
 Nicole Hofer as Carmen
 Ynez Veneracion as Soledad
 Stella Cañete as Munday
 Christian Joseph Leyson as Tetsuya (Japanese: 哲也, Tetsuya)
 Airah Fabioni Ombajin as Ningning
 Richard Quan as Guerilla Leader
 Richard Arellano as Guerilla Aide
 Mon Confiado as Ka Herman
 Neil Ryan Sese as Interpreter

Academy Award submission for nominee consideration
It was the Philippines' submission to the 74th Academy Awards for the 2001 Academy Award for Best Foreign Language Film, but was not accepted as a nominee.

See also

List of submissions to the 74th Academy Awards for Best Foreign Language Film

References

External links
 
 

2001 films
2000s war drama films
2000s English-language films
2000s Tagalog-language films
2000s Japanese-language films
Japanese occupation of the Philippines films
Philippine war drama films
Crown Seven films
2001 multilingual films
Philippine multilingual films
Films directed by Gil Portes